The Afghan Center for Socio-economic and Opinion Research (ACSOR or ACSOR-Surveys) is a commercial market and opinion research agency based in Kabul, Afghanistan. It was founded in 2003 by D3 Systems and TNS BBSS. The agency has had collaborations with USAID, the Asia Foundation, and the American Association for Public Opinion Research.

References

External links
 ACSOR-Surveys website

Research institutes in Afghanistan
2003 establishments in Afghanistan